Johnny Belinda is a 1940 play by Elmer Blaney Harris, dealing with the then shocking subjects of rape, murder, bastardy, abuse of a deaf-mute, bigotry and gossip in a small community. It ran for 321 performances on Broadway from September 18, 1940 to June 21, 1941, and has been repeatedly adapted for film, radio, television, and as a musical.

Plot summary
Set in Souris East, Prince Edward Island, and Charlottetown at the end of the 19th century, the isolated deaf-mute Belinda lives with her father and aunt in the remote farming and fishing community northwest of Nova Scotia.

Belinda is universally referred to as 'the Dummy' until the newly arrived doctor sees her potential and begins teaching her sign language. As her personality emerges from the silence her appearance also changes. She is raped by a local lad and gives birth to a son she names Johnny Belinda. The community assumes the child is the doctor's and shuns him and her family in moral outrage.

Matters come to a head when the biological father attempts to take his infant son from Belinda by force, and she kills him. At the ensuing trial all but the doctor are prepared to condemn Belinda for murder until the truth unexpectedly emerges: that she was acting in self-defense. She is set free with her baby and the doctor's good name is restored.

Adaptations
 Johnny Belinda (1948 film)
 Johnny Belinda CBC Radio play, 1950
 Johnny Belinda NBC Television, 1958
 Johnny Belinda "ITV Play of the Week," 1958 
 Johnny Belinda (1959 film), an Australian television play
 Johnny Belinda (1967 film), television movie
 Johnny Belinda, musical play by Mavor Moore and John Fenwick, Charlottetown Festival, 1968
 Belinda, CBC Television adaptation of the musical, telecast March 9, 1977
 Johnny Belinda, 1982 film starring Rosanna Arquette

External links
  IBDB Internet Broadway Database
 DPS Dramatists Play Service, Inc.
 Johnny Belinda | The Canadian Encyclopedia
 "ITV Play of the Week" Johnny Belinda (TV Episode 1958) - IMDb
 American Film Institute: AFI Catalog of Feature Films, The First 100 Years, 1893-1993

1940 plays
English-language plays
Plays set in Canada